TSN may refer to:

Science and technology
 Translin, a DNA binding protein involved in microRNA function
 Taxonomic serial number, a stable and unique taxonomic serial number issued by the Integrated Taxonomic Information System
 The Science Network, a non-profit, web-based organization concerned with science and its impact on society
 Time-Sensitive Networking, a set of IEEE 802 standards that define mechanisms for the transmission of time-sensitive data over Ethernet networks

Film and media
 Televiziyna Sluzhba Novyn, an integrated TV/web news service of the Ukrainian 1+1 TV channel

 The Sporting News, the former name of the American-based sports magazine Sporting News
 The Sports Network, a Canadian English-language cable television specialty channel
 Texas State Network, an all-news radio network available for stations in the state of Texas
 Television Sydney, a former television station in Sydney, Australia, which had a callsign of TSN

Other uses
 Tianjin Binhai International Airport (IATA code: TSN), Dongli District, Tianjin, China
 Tswana language (ISO 639 code: tsn), a language of Southern Africa
 Tyson Foods (NYSE code: TSN), an American multinational corporation